Irada Rovshan ((May 15, 1968 – September 30, 2014)) was an Azerbaijan architect and scientist.

Life
Irada Rovshan Abdullayeva (Mamedova) was born on May 15, 1968, in Zagatala. She graduated from Azerbaijan Architecture and Construction University (1990), and was a member of the Union of Architects of Azerbaijan (2013).
Rovshan completed secondary school No 2 in Zagatala (Russian language sector) in 1975-1985. Studying in X grade she was busy with training the correspondence preparation course of Leningrad (now St. Petersburg), The Institute of Engineering and Construction. 
She entered the University of Architecture and Construction and graduated there with honors in 1990 and received higher education after leaving secondary school. 
Rovshan began her professional career in 1991 in Sheki Regional Scientific Center of ANAS. Until 1998, she worked as the laboratory assistant, then a junior researcher.
She moved to St. Petersburg in 1998 and lived there until 2004. 
In 2004, she returned again to Sheki and continued working in Sheki Regional Scientific Center of the previous place.

Labour activity 
Rovshan has gained the respect of the co-workers of Sheki Regional Research Center. Her knowledge, ability and hardworking activities drew attention the scientific workers and they recommended her to continue on investigating.
Her research ability was taken into account by The Scientific Council of ANAS Institute of Architecture and Art and approved the theme "The interior of the Sheki houses" as a dissertation. Irada Rovshan has begun to investigate this theme with great interest and enthusiasm, at last successfully completed this challenging and exciting field of research. The members of the Council commission appreciated her scientific innovation and relevance of the research.
Rovshan has defended the theme "The interior of the Sheki houses" and was awarded the title of Candidate of Architecture (architecture, Ph.D.) on 25 December 2007 by the Scientific Council of the University of Architecture and Construction. After receiving a degree, she began her leadership position; she was appointed scientific secretary in the SHRSC. From 2013 until the last days of her life she was the head of the “Folklore and Ethnography” laboratory.
Roshan has published a book named "The interior of the Sheki houses (from eighteenth to early-twentieth century)" in 2008. At the same time, she published numerous scientific articles in the country as well as while working abroad.

Rovshan was not only interested in architecture; she also was interested in folk art and oral literature of Azerbaijan. Her ideas about national folklore attracted folklore experts.

All her published articles outside the borders of the country, and inside the country would be of interest to experts from time to time. 
Rovshan has also worked in the local  press (newspapers) for a long time, published the scientific- publicistic articles and gained a lot of readers.

Basic scientific achievements
1.	"Residential interiors of Sheki (at the end of the eighteenth and early nineteenth century)," Baku: "Science", 2008.- 152 pp. (Book - Azerbaijani and Russian language) 
2.	“Collection and analysis of samples of Balakan-Sheki region's folklore and folk arts."

Awards
1.	2008- Irada Rovshan was awarded the “Year winner" for the contribution to the development of science by Sheki Executive power 
2.	2012- was awarded the "Honor diploma" by the Azerbaijan National Academy of Sciences for 40-year anniversary of Sheki Regional Scientific

Scientific works
1.	National housing interior of Sheki, the value of its traditions in the formation of human personality. Baku, Urbanism. No.8, 2005, p. 127-133.
2.	Adorable folk style. News of Pedagogical University No.2; Baku, ASPU, 2005, p. 440-446.
3.	The house-museum of M.F. Akhundov. Architecture, urban planning history and restoration. SBMA. Baku, No. 5, p. 105-109.
4.	From the past to the present. Researching: No. 1, Baku, 2005, p. 329-336. 
5.	About Bukhara, bears and trays. Researching: No.3, Baku, 2004, p. 285-290.
6.	Look at the mirror once again,. Folklore and Ethnography. 2004, number 03, pp. 28–31.
7.	Jejim. Science and Life: No. 6, Baku, 2004, p. 33-34.
8.	Two century. Science and Life. No. 1-1, Baku, 2002, p. 20-21.
9.	About the interior of the Sheki city dwelling houses. Folklore and Ethnography: Baku, 2004, number 04, pp. 67–71.
10.	Embroidery "tekalduz" in the interior of the housing Sheki. Folklore and Ethnography: Baku, 2005, number 02, pp. 64–69.
11.	Let's look at one of the mirrors. Gobustan.: Baku, No. 2, 2005, с. 38-40.
12.	House of master Latif Haji Yusif oglu. Urbanism. Baku.
13.	Sheki ancient and modern yard fences, gates. Folklore and Ethnography: 2008, No. 3-4, p. 82-88.
14.	Sheki. Gelersen gorersen (Will come and see): 2008,
15.	The stones of creates and preserves the history. Folklore and Ethnography 2009, No. 2, p. 53-58.
16.	The great way of life (essays, memoirs). Compilers: Zechariah Alizadeh, Irade Rovshan. Baku: "Science and Education", 2010, 416 p.
17.	Live museums. Folklore and Ethnography 2011, No. 02, p. 22-26
18.	Sheki city is an architectural monument. Folklore and Ethnography 2012, No. 01, p. 61-66
19.	Sheki. Gobustan .: Baku, No. 1, 2012
20.	Urban planning and architecture of Sheki during the development of sericulture (XVIII-XX centuries). Fundamental and applied science problems. M .: Academy of Sciences, 2012

External links
Мамедова, Ирада Ровшан кызы Интерьер шекинского жилья (конец XVIII-начало ХХ века)
AMEA Şəki Regional Elmi Mərkəzi 
ŞREM
Şəkinin elmi ictimaiyyətinə ağır itki üz verib
"ŞƏKİ YAŞAYIŞ EVLƏRİNİN İNTERYERİ (XVIII ə.sonu- XX ə.əvvəlləri)"
"UCALDAN VƏ YAŞADAN DAŞLAR"
"Din ayrı, dövlət ayrı..."
"Daş. kərpic, taxta."
"İpəkçiliyin Şəki memarlığına təsiri"

1968 births
2014 deaths
Azerbaijani women architects
Azerbaijani architectural historians
Azerbaijani academics
Azerbaijani women academics
20th-century Azerbaijani architects
21st-century Azerbaijani architects
Women historians